Karl (Carl) Moriz (Moritz) Diesing (16 June 1800, in Krakow – 10 January 1867, in Vienna) was an Austrian naturalist and zoologist,  specializing in the study of helminthology.

He studied medicine at the University of Vienna, earning his doctorate in 1826. Afterwards, he served as an assistant to botanist Nikolaus Joseph von Jacquin, later working as an intern at the Hof-Naturalien-Cabinet (from 1829). In 1836, he became a curator of the zoological collections.

In the late 1840s, he began to suffer from serious eye problems, and shortly afterwards experienced permanent blindness.

His principal works include Systema Helminthum (2 vols., 1850–1851), and Revision der Nematoden (1861).

In his paper "Versuch einer monographie der Gattung Pentastoma" (Ann. Wien Mus. Naturges. 1836, 1–32), he was the first to establish the distinct nature of the Pentastomida, placing them in a new group which he called Acanthotheca.

The genera Diesingia  and Diesingiella  are named after him.

References

External links 
 
 IPNI List of plants described.

1800 births
1867 deaths
Austrian naturalists
Austrian zoologists
Scientists from Kraków
Polish emigrants to Austria